Donkey Kong is a video game franchise created by Shigeru Miyamoto and published by Nintendo. Games in the franchise have been developed by a variety of developers including Nintendo, Rare, Paon and Retro Studios. While the first games were arcade releases, most Donkey Kong games have been released for Nintendo consoles and handhelds since the third generation.

It debuted in 1981 with the arcade game Donkey Kong, which was a sales success that brought Nintendo into the North American market. With the original arcade games being ported into versions on third-party home consoles and developed by several companies. The Donkey Kong franchise has sold a total of 82 million copies as of 2022.

Most of the games in the franchise are platform games, although the series also includes spin-offs other genres such as racing and rhythm games. The franchise is centered on the anthropomorphic gorilla Donkey Kong and his clan of other apes and monkeys. Many of the Donkey Kong games use supporting characters throughout gameplay, allowing the player to control different members of the family. The success of the series is commonly attributed to its technical innovation and entertaining platforming sequences.

Arcade games

Home console games

Portable and handheld games

Mario vs. Donkey Kong spin-off series

Canceled games

References

External links
 Official Nintendo website
Official Paon website 

Donkey Kong games
Donkey Kong
Donkey Kong